Li Fabin (Chinese: 李发彬; born 15 January 1993) is a Chinese weightlifter, World Champion, and three time Asian Champion competing in the 56 kg division until 2018 and 61 kg starting in 2018 after the International Weightlifting Federation reorganized the categories.

Career
He competed at the 2018 World Championships in the newly created 61 kg category, winning a silver medal in the snatch and in the total. He competed at the 2019 Asian Weightlifting Championships in the 61 kg division winning gold medals in all lifts.

In 2021, he won the gold medal in the men's 61 kg event at the 2020 Summer Olympics in Tokyo, Japan.

Major results

References

External links

1993 births
Living people
Chinese male weightlifters
World Weightlifting Championships medalists
Weightlifters at the 2020 Summer Olympics
Olympic gold medalists for China
Olympic medalists in weightlifting
Medalists at the 2020 Summer Olympics
Olympic weightlifters of China
21st-century Chinese people